Estonia participated in the Eurovision Song Contest 2008 with the song "Leto svet" written by Priit Pajusaar, Tarmo Leinatamm, Hannes Võrno, Peeter Oja and Glen Pilvre. The song was performed by the group Kreisiraadio. The Estonian broadcaster Eesti Rahvusringhääling (ERR) organised the national final Eurolaul 2008 in order to select the Estonian entry for the 2008 contest in Belgrade, Serbia. Ten songs competed in the national final and the winner was selected over two rounds of public voting. In the first round, the top three were selected to qualify to the superfinal. In the superfinal, "Leto svet" performed by Kreisiraadio was selected as the winner.

Estonia was drawn to compete in the first semi-final of the Eurovision Song Contest which took place on 20 May 2008. Performing during the show in position 3, "Leto svet" was not announced among the 10 qualifying entries of the first semi-final and therefore did not qualify to compete in the final. It was later revealed that Estonia placed eighteenth out of the 19 participating countries in the semi-final with 8 points.

Background 

In 2007, "Partners in Crime" performed by Gerli Padar failed to qualify Estonia to the final where the song placed twenty-second in the semi-final.

The Estonian national broadcaster, Eesti Rahvusringhääling (ERR), broadcasts the event within Estonia and organises the selection process for the nation's entry. Since their debut, the Estonian broadcaster has organised national finals that feature a competition among multiple artists and songs in order to select Estonia's entry for the Eurovision Song Contest. The Eurolaul competition has been organised since 1996 in order to select Estonia's entry and on 17 September 2007, ERR announced the organisation of Eurolaul 2008 in order to select the nation's 2008 entry.

Before Eurovision

Eurolaul 2008 
Eurolaul 2008 was the fifteenth edition of the Estonian national selection Eurolaul, which selected Estonia's entry for the Eurovision Song Contest 2008. The competition consisted of a ten-song final on 2 February 2008 at the ERR studios in Tallinn, hosted by Marko Reikop and Eda-Ines Etti and broadcast on Eesti Televisioon (ETV) as well as streamed online at the broadcaster's official website etv.ee and the official Eurovision Song Contest website eurovision.tv.

Competing entries 
On 2 October 2007, ERR opened the submission period for artists and composers to submit their entries up until 26 October 2007. All artists and composers were required to have Estonian citizenship or be a permanent resident of Estonia. 58 submissions were received by the deadline. An 11-member jury panel selected 5 finalists from the submissions, while an additional 5 finalists were selected by ERR via composers directly invited for the competition: Alar Kotkas, Elmar Liitmaa, Priit Pajusaar, Rein Rannap and Hendrik Sal-Saller. The selected songs were announced during the ETV program Kes pääses finaali? on 1 December 2007. The selection jury consisted of Toomas Puna (Raadio Sky+ program director), Alari Kivisaar (Raadio Sky+ presenter), Allan Roosileht (Star FM presenter), Andres Panksep (Raadio Uuno chief editor), Ahto Kruusmann (Raadio Uuno presenter), Raul Saaremets (Raadio 2 program director), Olev Ehrlich (Vikerraadio head of music), Ivan Makarov (Raadio 4 music editor), Owe Petersell (Raadio Elmar chief editor), Koit Raudsepp (Raadio 2 presenter) and Sven Lõhmus (composer).

Final 
The final took place on 2 February 2008. Ten songs competed during the show and the winner was selected over two rounds of public televoting. In the first round, the top three entries proceeded to the second round, and in the second round, "Leto svet" performed by Kreisiraadio was selected as the winner entirely by a public televote. The public vote registered 64,851 votes in the first round and 96,471 votes in the superfinal. In addition to the performances of the competing entries, Sahlene, who represented Estonia in the Eurovision Song Contest 2002, and Gerli Padar, who represented Estonia in the Eurovision Song Contest 2007, with Taavi Langdi performed as the interval acts.

At Eurovision
It was announced in September 2007 that the competition's format would be expanded to two semi-finals in 2008. According to the rules, all nations with the exceptions of the host country and the "Big Four" (France, Germany, Spain and the United Kingdom) are required to qualify from one of two semi-finals in order to compete for the final; the top nine songs from each semi-final as determined by televoting progress to the final, and a tenth was determined by back-up juries. The European Broadcasting Union (EBU) split up the competing countries into six different pots based on voting patterns from previous contests, with countries with favourable voting histories put into the same pot. On 28 January 2008, a special allocation draw was held which placed each country into one of the two semi-finals. Estonia was placed into the first semi-final, to be held on 20 May 2008. The running order for the semi-finals was decided through another draw on 17 March 2008 and Estonia was set to perform in position 3, following the entry from Israel and before the entry from Moldova.

The two semi-finals and the final were broadcast in Estonia on ETV with commentary by Marko Reikop. The Estonian spokesperson, who announced the Estonian votes during the final, was Sahlene who had previously represented Estonia in the Eurovision Song Contest in 2002.

Semi-final 

Kreisiraadio took part in technical rehearsals on 11 and 15 May, followed by dress rehearsals on 19 and 20 May. The Estonian performance featured the members of Kreisiraadio performing on stage in yellow, red and blue suits and joined by three dancers in golden tops waving big signs as well as the Serbian, Estonian, German and Finnish flags: Kauna Kõrge-Hårajuvet, Laura Lambut and Merit Reigam. The stage displayed green, yellow and red colours and the song title "Leto svet" appeared on the LED screens. The performance also featured the use of a non-functioning piano and an accordion.

At the end of the show, Estonia was not announced among the top 10 entries in the first semi-final and therefore failed to qualify to compete in the final. It was later revealed that Estonia placed 18th in the semi-final, receiving a total of 8 points.

Voting 
Below is a breakdown of points awarded to Estonia and awarded by Estonia in the first semi-final and grand final of the contest. The nation awarded its 12 points to Finland in the semi-final and to Russia in the final of the contest.

Points awarded to Estonia

Points awarded by Estonia

References

External links
 Eurolaul 2008 homepage 

2008
Countries in the Eurovision Song Contest 2008
Eurovision